Elmore B. Barbour (October 23, 1892 – June 27, 1948), nicknamed "Bull", was an American Negro league first baseman in the 1920s.

A native of Greenfield, Ohio, Barbour made his Negro leagues debut in 1921 with the Pittsburgh Keystones, and played with Pittsburgh again in 1922. He died in Greenfield in 1948 at age 55.

References

External links
 and Baseball-Reference Black Baseball Stats and Seamheads

1892 births
1948 deaths
Pittsburgh Keystones players
Baseball first basemen
Baseball players from Ohio
People from Greenfield, Ohio
20th-century African-American sportspeople